Heckfield is a village in Hampshire, England. It lies between Reading and Hook.

It is the location of Highfield Park, where Neville Chamberlain died in 1940, and it is adjacent to Stratfield Saye House, the large stately home that has been the home of the Dukes of Wellington since 1817. It is now a hotel and venue facility.

References

Further reading
 W. J. James History of Heckfield and Mattingley

External links

Villages in Hampshire